Salvatore Antonio "Sal" Naturile, also known as Donald Matterson (c. 1953/1954– August 23, 1972)  was an American bank robber whose attempted robbery of a Chase Manhattan bank branch in Brooklyn, along with John Wojtowicz, in August 1972, inspired the 1975 film Dog Day Afternoon. In the film he is portrayed by actor John Cazale.

Early life

Little is known about Naturile's background except for criminal acts he committed and that he lived in Manhattan, in the same neighborhood as John Wojtowicz. As a child growing up in Keansburg, New Jersey, Naturile had been picked up and arrested on many charges of truancy, grand larceny, burglary and dangerous drugs. He spent most of his teen years in and out of state reform schools, and as a youth while incarcerated in prison, he was victim to numerous acts of sodomy from older, stronger inmates.

Within the three months before the fatal robbery attempt, Naturile had been charged with possession of burglary tools and possession of narcotics. 

In his novelization of the crime, Patrick Mann suggests that Naturile had connections with the Italian mafia in New York City,  but he had no known associations with organized crime. Naturile sported a faint blond mustache, and crude tattoos on his arms and thighs. He lived mostly as a drifter, but a New York Times article stated that he remained in contact with and occasionally lived with his mother.

The robbery
Naturile and Wojtowicz first met at Danny's, a gay bar on Seventh Avenue South in lower Manhattan, where Wojtowicz initially claimed that a bank executive from Chase Manhattan had suggested they rob the bank.

On August 22, 1972, Naturile and two accomplices attempted to rob a branch of the Chase Manhattan bank at 450 Avenue P in Gravesend, Brooklyn; the robbery was led by John Wojtowicz and Robert Westenberg. The robbers entered the bank armed with a .38 caliber handgun and carrying a box which contained a shotgun and a rifle; all three weapons were purchased by Wojtowicz. 

Westenberg was to provide the demand note to the bank manager but, unnerved by a police car on the street, fled the scene before the robbery was announced. Wojtowicz and Naturile then held seven Chase Manhattan bank employees hostage for 14 hours. Wojtowicz, a former bank teller, had some knowledge of bank operations and drew inspiration from scenes of The Godfather (1972), which he had seen earlier that day. The note they passed to the cashier read: "This is an offer you can't refuse."

Before the robbery, Naturile had informed Wojtowicz and Westenberg that he would rather die than go back to prison. He was seen by the police on the scene as being nervous, high strung, and volatile. The police feared that increasing the pressure placed on Naturile and Wojtowicz would cause them to become frightened, unbalanced, and impossible to negotiate with on reasonable terms.

During the robbery, Naturile was dressed in a black business suit and tie, and carried an attaché case. His last meal consisted of takeout pizza and soda pop, which he consumed during the holdout at the bank with the hostages. The robbery was meant to fund the sex reassignment operation of Wojtowicz's trans wife, Elizabeth Eden. Naturile's share was to finance his two sisters' removal from foster care and separation from their mother, who drank and neglected all three of her children.

The standoff with police
During the robbery, Naturile surveyed the street and alleyway, realizing the robbers were surrounded by police. The bank manager and tellers he held hostage reported later that he spoke often of the tremendous power of the .30-06 rifle and his ability and willingness to use it. 

The Federal Bureau of Investigation (FBI) and New York City Police Department (NYPD) feared Naturile during the hostage situation more than the more stable Wojtowicz. Naturile was the only one of the robbers who had a previous criminal record and was known by the police. 

Wojtowicz fired a single shot at the police through the Chase Manhattan bank's exit rear door, fearing the police were preparing to storm the building. Only one other shot was fired during the standoff: when the rifle used by Wojtowicz accidentally discharged when it was dropped on the floor.

Assuming the Donald Matterson identity
Wojtowicz identified Naturile to police by his criminal alias, "Donald Matterson". Naturile had used the alias when he was arrested for possession of narcotics and burglary tools five months before the bank robbery. Consequently, for two hours, local television stations, live at the scene, reported that the two suspects were Wojtowicz and Donald Matterson. It was not until later the latter was officially identified as Salvatore Naturile, who had charges pending against him for his arrest in Manhattan for possession of burglary tools, after having been released on parole.

Ambush and death

When entering the limo to be chauffeured to the John F. Kennedy International Airport in South Ozone Park, Queens, along with the hostages, Wojtowicz told Naturile to sit with bank employee Shirley Ball and one of her co-workers in the third row, while the others sat in the fourth, reserving the fifth row for himself and the two remaining hostages. There was a .38 caliber handgun hidden in the front seat of the limousine that Wojtowicz missed when searching the vehicle upon its first arriving at the bank. FBI Special Agent Fred Fehl positioned himself on the driver's side of the limo next to the open window closest to Naturile, who sat between two hostages in the third row. FBI Special Agent Dick Baker took up a position on the right side of the car closest to Wojtowicz, who was still situated in the rear seat. NYPD Police Chief of Detectives Louis C. Cottell, who headed the negotiations during the initial standoff, stayed 15 feet away from the rear of the limo.

When everyone prepared for the final standoff, the "getaway" Hansa Jet rolled out onto the tarmac where they sat in the limo. Baker asked agent James Murphy, who was posing as the limousine driver, to ask whether the group wanted any food on the flight. Agent Murphy took advantage of this opportunity to assess the threat Naturile and Wojtowicz posed from where they were situated in the vehicle as he turned to ask them the  trigger question. Baker responded with one word, "Yes," which was Murphy's cue to act. Agent Murphy grabbed the handgun with his left hand and ordered the two men to "freeze." Simultaneously, Agent Fehl and the driver wrestled with the barrel of Naturile's shotgun, knocking it toward the ceiling. 

Agent Murphy shot Naturile in the head at close range. Naturile slumped in the seat, mortally wounded. 

Agent Baker secured the rifle lying across Wojtowicz's lap. Wojtowicz surrendered without further incident. 

Naturile was rushed to the hospital by an ambulance that was waiting at the scene but was pronounced dead on arrival. A middle-aged man named Wallace Hamilton, who told reporters he was a friend of Naturile's, identified Naturile's corpse at the city morgue following the robbery.

Dog Day Afternoon
Naturile's story was used as part of the basis for the film Dog Day Afternoon. Released in 1975, it starred Al Pacino as Wojtowicz (called "Sonny Wortzik" in the film) and John Cazale, Pacino's co-star in The Godfather (1972), as Naturile.

In 1975, Wojtowicz wrote a letter to The New York Times expressing concern that people would believe the film version of the events, which he said was only "30% accurate". Among other objections, he stated that the film insinuated he had "sold out" Naturile to the police, which he claims was untrue. Several attempts were made on Wojtowicz's life following an inmate screening of the movie.

An 18-year-old actor was originally to be cast in the role of Naturile, but actor John Cazale, who was 39 years old at the time of production, ultimately got the part.

References

Further reading
 Game of Thieves: The Astonishing Inside Story of the Supertechnology Used by Criminals in Bank Robberies and Burglaries by Robert R. Rosberg
 Documentary "The Making of Dog Day Afternoon" present on disc 2 of the two-disc Special Edition DVD.
 The Boys in the Bank" by P.F. Kluge and Thomas Moore for Life, September 22, 1972, Vol. 73(12).
 ejumpcut.org
 ironicsans.com
 A Blighted "Affair" Led to Bank Holdup" August 24, 1972 The New York Times
 A Mobster is Linked to Bizarre Holdup August 26, 1972 The New York Times

1950s births
1972 deaths
American bank robbers
American people of Italian descent
Deaths by firearm in Queens, New York
People shot dead by law enforcement officers in the United States